Arturo Vega (13 October 1947 – 8 June 2013) was a Mexican-American graphic designer best known for his long association with the punk rock group The Ramones. 
He designed the group's iconic logo, and was sometimes called the fifth Ramone. Officially dubbed the group's artistic director, he was also charged with designing stage lighting for concerts, supervised sales of shirts and other merchandise and was the band's sometimes spokesman.

In 1973, Vega became friends with Dee Dee Ramone (born Douglas Colvin) whose girlfriend lived in Vega's apartment building. During the band's existence between 1974 and 1996, Vega attended all but a handful of their over 2,200 concerts.

Vega's logo for the Ramones was inspired by the U.S. Presidential Seal, with several alterations including the band member's names arranged in a circle, and the eagle gripping a baseball bat rather than a quiver of arrows (a reference to their song "Beat on the Brat" and Johnny Ramone's love of baseball). He adapted the Presidential Seal to reflect his belief that Ramones were "the ultimate all-American band”.

Vega died from cancer on 8 June 2013 at the age of 65.

Career

Inspired by Andy Warhol, Piet Mondrian or Roy Lichtenstein in his artistic approach, Arturo Vega likes to play with shapes, words and bright colors and is thus close to the pop art movement.

A photograph of the Ramones by Vega was exhibited at MoMa in 2014 as part of the exhibition Designing Modern Women 1890 - 1990. In 2017, a retrospective exhibition was held at Howl Art in New York City, entitled "Empire: An Arturo Vega Retrospective".

Several exhibitions and institutions are linked to Vega's work. In 2008, the artist moved to Berlin to mount the permanent exhibition of the Ramones Museum in the central district of Berlin-Mitte. About Vega, the Ramones Museum team says: "He was constantly urging us to shake things up and move things around, to see things differently, to experiment and not to keep anything set in stone. As he did in his own work. [He would constantly push us to change or move things around, encourage us to experiment and not hold on to things for too long. Just as he did with his own work]".

The non-profit organization Howl! Arts, located in New York City's East Village and founded in 2015 by Jane Friedman, offers regular retrospectives that include Vega's work. A great friend of Friedman's and one of the founding pillars of Howl Arts Gallery, Vega will in fact donate her work to the gallery. The exhibition Icons, Iconoclasts and Outsiders, held from September 2021 to March 2022, includes several of his paintings, as does the 2015 exhibition Arturo Vega American Treasure at Howl! and Empire: An Arturo Vega Retrospective in 2016 at the Bob Rauschenberg Gallery.

References

External links
Official website
 The Legacy of Arturo Vega, Art Director of the Ramones discussion at Queens Museum, June 19, 2016 (YouTube)

1947 births
2013 deaths
American artists
American artists of Mexican descent
Mexican artists
Ramones